Sin City Saints is an American sitcom television series starring Malin Åkerman, Andrew Santino, and Keith Powers. It debuted on Yahoo! Screen  on March 23, 2015. Its eight-episode first season was directed by Bryan Gordon and Fred Savage. The series follows a fictional Las Vegas basketball franchise.

Its executive producers are Bryan Gordon, Mike Tollin, and Chris Case. The series ended following Yahoo! Screen's closure due to low viewership in the following year.

Premise
Sin City Saints follows "wealthy tech businessman Jake Tullus, the unpredictable and charismatic owner of Vegas’ new professional basketball franchise, the Sin City Saints."

Cast

Starring
 Malin Åkerman as Dusty Halford
 Andrew Santino as Jake Tullus
 Keith Powers as LaDarius Pope
 Justin Chon as Byron Summers
 B.K. Cannon as Melissa Stanton
 Rick Fox as Sam Johnson
 Tom Arnold as Kevin Freeman

Recurring
 Ryan Cartwright as Wade Leatherbee (8 episodes)
 Toby Huss as Coach Doug (8 episodes)
 Paul Duke as Artahk Sundovk (7 episodes)
 Baron Davis as Billy Crane (7 episodes)
 Aaron Takahashi as Henry (6 episodes)
 Chris Gehrt as Todd (6 episodes)
 Jill Bartlett as Sapphire (6 episodes)
 Jean Louisa Kelly as Bernice Pope (5 episodes)
 Michael Liu as Wu Lee (5 episodes)
 Rosalind Chao as Mrs. Wu (5 episodes)
 John Salley as Tom (4 episodes)
Brendan Jennings as Andy the Mascot (3 episodes)

Guest stars
 Adam Devine as Matty ("You Booze, You Lose")
 Dan Bakkedahl as Dan ("Urine God's Hands Now")

Episodes

Production
Yahoo! Inc. announced its first original long-form programs, the comedies Sin City Saints and Other Space, in April 2014 at the 2014 Digital Content NewFronts. By early October, production on Sin City Saints had begun at The Orleans Hotel and Casino. Eight episodes were released simultaneously on Yahoo! Screen on March 23, 2015.

Reception

Critical
Mike Hale in The New York Times called the show "a comedy less coherent than the halftime scoreboard video at an NBA game", where "[p]lot points and jokes feel as if they came from index cards grabbed at random." Keith Uhlich at The Hollywood Reporter felt the "manic, mostly unfunny half-hour sports comedy" featured "sub-Tracy and Hepburn bickering ... that barely elicits a smirk, let alone busts a gut", and called the casting "problematic.... Both Akerman and Santino are irritatingly one-note."

Financial
On October 21, 2015, Yahoo CFO Ken Goldman announced during a Q3 Earnings Phone Call that their original programming lineup last spring resulted in a $42 million writeoff, including season six of Community and Other Space.

See also
 List of original programs distributed by Yahoo! Screen

References

External links

2010s American sitcoms
English-language television shows
2015 web series debuts
2015 web series endings
Television shows set in the Las Vegas Valley
Single-camera television sitcoms
American comedy web series
Yahoo! Screen original programming